= Kadlecia trifoliata =

Scientific classification
- Kingdom: Animalia
- Phylum: Arthropoda
- Class: Insecta
- Order: Coleoptera
- Suborder: Polyphaga
- Infraorder: Scarabaeiformia
- Family: Scarabaeidae
- Genus: Kadlecia
- Species: K. trifoliata

Binomial name
- Kadlecia trifoliata Frey, 1970

Species of beetle

Kadlecia trifoliata is a species of beetle of the family Scarabaeidae. It is found in Somalia.

== Description ==
Adults reach a length of about 4.5-6 mm. The head is dark brown, the pronotum light brown to dark brown, the elytra light brown, the underside and antennae brown and the legs dark brown. The upper surface is glabrous, while the underside, legs and pygidium have long, dense and whitish hairs. The pronotum and one antennal segment have long white and greyish cilia, sometimes elytra are also short-ciliate.
